Centerville is an unincorporated community in Belmont County, in the U.S. state of Ohio.

History
Centerville was laid out in 1817, and most likely was named from its location near the geographical center of Smith Township. An old variant name of Centerville was Demos. A post office called Demos was established in 1837, and remained in operation until 1923.

References

Unincorporated communities in Belmont County, Ohio
1817 establishments in Ohio
Populated places established in 1817
Unincorporated communities in Ohio